Hillham is an unincorporated community in Columbia Township, Dubois County, in the U.S. state of Indiana.

History
Hillham was not platted. A post office was established at Hillham in 1864, and remained in operation until it was discontinued in 1937.

Geography

References

Unincorporated communities in Dubois County, Indiana
Unincorporated communities in Indiana
Jasper, Indiana micropolitan area